Shrapnel may refer to:

Military 
 Shrapnel shell, explosive artillery munitions, generally for anti-personnel use 
 Shrapnel (fragment), a hard loose material

Popular culture 
Shrapnel (Radical Comics) 
 Shrapnel, a game by Adam Cadre

Characters 
Shrapnel (DC Comics), a supervillain
Shrapnel (Transformers)

Music 
 Shrapnel (American punk band), an American punk band
 Shrapnel (Welsh punk band), a 1981–1988 musical group
 Shrapnel Records,  music label
 Shrapnel, a.k.a. Metal Church, an American heavy metal band
 "Shrapnel", a song on the Atmosphere album God Loves Ugly

People
Henry Jones Shrapnell (1792–1834),  anatomist
Henry Shrapnel (1761–1842), British Army officer and anti-personnel-munition innovator
Norman Shrapnel (1912–2004),  writer 
John Shrapnel (1942–2020),  actor 
Hugh Shrapnel (born 1947),  composer 
Lex Shrapnel (born 1979), actor

See also
Shrapnell's membrane, a portion of the tympanic membrane